Lorna Bingham (1912 – 10 July 1970) was an Australian actress writer best known for her work on radio and her children's books. She was a leading writer for George Edwards for a number of years, writing and producing many episodes of serial Dad and Dave from Snake Gully over a 9-year period, a series in which she also features as an actress.

Born to actress Loris Bingham, both her parents worked in the theatre for J.C. Williamson and Lorna began her career as an actress. She began writing for radio.

References

External links
Lorna Bingham at AustLit

1912 births
1970 deaths
Australian radio actresses
Australian radio writers
Women radio writers
20th-century Australian actresses
20th-century Australian women writers
20th-century Australian writers